Alangium circulare is a tree in the dogwood family Cornaceae. The specific epithet  is from the Latin meaning "circular", referring to shape of the leaves.

Description
The smooth bark is grey-brown. The inflorescence is greyish pubescent.

Distribution and habitat
Alangium circulare is endemic to Borneo where it is confined to Sarawak. Its habitat is kerangas forest.

References

circulare
Trees of Borneo
Endemic flora of Borneo
Flora of Sarawak
Plants described in 1975
Taxonomy articles created by Polbot
Flora of the Sundaland heath forests